The Saint: Wrong Number is a 1990 TV film featuring Simon Dutton as Simon Templar, the crimefighter also known as The Saint. It was one of a series of Saint films produced in Australia and broadcast as part of the syndicated series Mystery Wheel of Adventure.

Plot
Simon Templar spends a weekend in Berlin with a girlfriend, and he ends up with a chance to prevent missiles getting into the hands of terrorists.

Cast
 Simon Dutton as Simon Templar
 Günther Maria Halmer as Otto Schmidt (as Günther-Maria Halmer)
 Arielle Dombasle as Stella Moreau
 Vince Edwards as General Daniel T. Donovan

Production
This movie was one of six 100-minute TV films, all starring Simon Dutton made for London Weekend Television (LWT) in the United Kingdom, it was postponed due to poor ratings, but went out as part of The Mystery Wheel of Adventure in the United States:
 The Saint: The Brazilian Connection (2 September 1989)
 The Saint: The Blue Dulac (9 September 1989)
 The Saint: The Software Murders (4 August 1990)
 The Saint in Australia (14 July 1990)
 The Saint: The Big Bang (28 July 1990)

Broadcast
The film was postponed for broadcasting on 14 July 1990 and on 7 July 1990, and finally broadcast on 21 July 1990.

External links

1990 films
1990 television films
1990s English-language films